The Dniester is a transboundary river in Eastern Europe. It runs first through Ukraine and then through Moldova (from which it more or less separates the breakaway territory of Transnistria), finally discharging into the Black Sea on Ukrainian territory again.

Names 
The name Dniester derives from Sarmatian dānu nazdya "the close river." (The Dnieper, also of Sarmatian origin, derives from the opposite meaning, "the river on the far side".) Alternatively, according to Vasily Abaev Dniester would be a blend of Scythian dānu "river" and Thracian Ister, the previous name of the river, literally Dān-Ister (River Ister). The Ancient Greek name of Dniester, Tyras (Τύρας), is from Scythian tūra, meaning "rapid."

The names of the Don and Danube are also from the same Indo-Iranian word *dānu "river". Classical authors have also referred to it as Danaster. These early forms, without -i- but with -a-, contradict Abaev's hypothesis. Edward Gibbon refers to the river both as the Niester and Dniester in his History of the Decline and Fall of the Roman Empire.

Dnestr), in Yiddish: Nester נעסטער; in Turkish, Turla; and in Lithuanian as Dniestras.

Geography 
The Dniester rises in Ukraine, near the city of Drohobych, close to the border with Poland, and flows toward the Black Sea. It later forms an additional part of the Moldova-Ukraine border, then flows through Ukraine to the Black Sea, where its estuary forms the Dniester Liman.

Along the lower half of the Dniester, the western bank is high and hilly while the eastern one is low and flat. The river represents the de facto end of the Eurasian Steppe. Its most important tributaries are Răut and Bîc.

History 

During the Neolithic, the Dniester River was the centre of one of the most advanced civilizations on earth at the time. The Cucuteni–Trypillian culture flourished in this area from roughly 5300 to 2600 BC, leaving behind thousands of archeological sites. Their settlements had up to 15,000 inhabitants, making them among the first large farming communities in the world.
 
In antiquity, the river was considered one of the principal rivers of European Sarmatia, and it was mentioned by many Classical geographers and historians. According to Herodotus (iv.51) it rose in a large lake, whilst Ptolemy (iii.5.17, 8.1 &c.) places its sources in Mount Carpates (the modern Carpathian Mountains), and Strabo (ii) says that they are unknown. It ran in an easterly direction parallel with the Ister (lower Danube), and formed part of the boundary between Dacia and Sarmatia. It fell into the Pontus Euxinus to the northeast of the mouth of the Ister, the distance between them being 900 stadia – approximately  – according to Strabo (vii.), while  (from the Pseudostoma) according to Pliny (iv. 12. s. 26). Scymnus (Fr. 51) describes it as of easy navigation, and abounding in fish. Ovid (ex Pont. iv.10.50) speaks of its rapid course.

Greek authors referred to the river as Tyras. At a later period it obtained the name of Danastris or Danastus, whence its modern name of Dniester (Niester), though the Turks still called it Turla during the 19th century. The form  is sometimes found.

According to Constantine VII, the Varangians used boats on their trade route from the Varangians to the Greeks, along Dniester and Dnieper and along the Black Sea shore. The navigation near the western shore of Black Sea contained stops at Aspron (at the mouth of Dniester), then Conopa, Constantia (localities today in Romania) and Messembria (today in Bulgaria).

From the 14th century to 1812, part of the Dniester formed the eastern boundary of the Principality of Moldavia.

Between the World Wars, the Dniester formed part of the boundary between Romania and the Soviet Union. In 1919, on Easter Sunday, the bridge was blown up by the French Army to protect Bender from the Bolsheviks. During World War II, German and Romanian forces battled Soviet troops on the western bank of the river.

After the Republic of Moldova declared its independence in 1991, the small area to the east of the Dniester that had been part of the Moldavian SSR refused to participate and declared itself the Pridnestrovian Moldavian Republic, or Transnistria, with its capital at Tiraspol on the river.

Tributaries 

See also 
 Dniester Canyon
 Dniester Pumped Storage Power Station
 Euroregion Dniester

Notes

References

General

External links 

 
 Volodymyr Kubijovyč, Ivan Teslia, Dnister River in the Encyclopedia of Ukraine, vol. 1 (1984).
 Dniester.org: a trans-boundary Dniester river project
 eco-tiras.org

 
 
Moldova–Ukraine border
Ottoman Empire–Russian Empire border
Ramsar sites in Moldova
Ramsar sites in Ukraine
Rivers of Transnistria
Rivers of Lviv Oblast
Rivers of Ivano-Frankivsk Oblast
Rivers of Ternopil Oblast
Rivers of Chernivtsi Oblast
Rivers of Khmelnytskyi Oblast
Rivers of Vinnytsia Oblast
Rivers of Odesa Oblast
Romania–Soviet Union border